Wu Junxie (born 1928) is a Chinese translator.

Wu is most notable for being one of the main translators into Chinese of the works of the English novelists Charlotte Brontë and Virginia Woolf.

Biography
Wu was born in Hangzhou, Zhejiang in 1928.

He graduated from Zhejiang University in 1951, where he majored in English.
After graduation, Wu was appointed an officer to the Chinese State Council and the Propaganda Department of the Communist Party of China.

In 1959, Wu was transferred to the People's Literature Publishing House as an editor.

After the Cultural Revolution, Wu joined the China Writers Association in 1982.

Works
 The Biography of Leo Tolstoy
 Jane Eyre (Charlotte Brontë)
 The Old Man and the Sea (Ernest Hemingway)
 The Textbook of Woolf (Virginia Woolf)
 The Collected Works of Woolf (Virginia Woolf)
 Play Making

Awards
 Chinese Translation Association – Senior Translator (2004)

References

1928 births
Writers from Hangzhou
Zhejiang University alumni
People's Republic of China translators
English–Chinese translators
Living people
20th-century Chinese translators
21st-century Chinese translators